S.M.A.R.T. is a mnemonic acronym, giving criteria to guide in the setting of goals and objectives that are assumed to give better results, for example in project management, employee-performance management and personal development. The term was first proposed by George T. Doran in the November 1981 issue of Management Review. He suggested that goals should be SMART (specific, measurable, assignable, realistic and time-related). 

Since then, other variations of the acronym have been used, a commonly used version includes the alternative words: attainable, relevant, and timely. Additional letters have been added by some authors.

Those who support the use of SMART objectives suggest they provide a clear road map for both the person setting the goal and the person evaluating their progress (e.g. employee and employer, or athlete and coach). The person setting the goal is said to gain a clear understanding of what needs to be delivered and the person evaluating can then assess the outcome based on defined criteria. SMART criteria are commonly associated with Peter Drucker's management by objectives concept.

Often, the terms S.M.A.R.T. Goals and S.M.A.R.T. Objectives are used. Although the acronym SMART generally stays the same, objectives and goals can differ. Goals are the distinct purpose that is to be anticipated from the assignment or project, while objectives, on the other hand, are the determined steps that will direct full completion of the project goals.

History
The November 1981 issue of Management Review (AMA Forum) contained a paper by George T. Doran called There's a S.M.A.R.T. way to write management's goals and objectives. It discussed the importance of objectives and the difficulty of setting them.

Common usage
Each letter in SMART refers to a different criterion for judging objectives. There is some variation in usage, but perhaps the most commonly used criteria today are:

Effectiveness 
Although SMART goals are widely used and often recommended, their effectiveness is widely debated. The meaning of "SMART" can vary in practice, such as SMARTS goals that adds "self-defined" or SMARTER goals.

Physical Activity 
A review of the evidence on the SMART acronym to increase physical activity found that its use is not based on scientific theory, is not supported by evidence, and has potentially harmful effects.  In contrast, a growing body of evidence suggests that non-specific and open-ended goals (e.g. "see how fast I can run 5km" or "see how far I can walk in 3 hours") may be more effective to increase physical activity. In the context of physical activity, research suggests that specific goals are no more effective than vague goals and vague goals may be advantageous for the physically inactive. Research suggests that challenging goals are more effective than specific goals. Swann et al note that the paper introducing SMART lacks a theoretical framework or empirical evidence, in contrast to the literature on goal setting.

Additional criteria
Some authors have added additional letters giving additional criteria.  Examples are given below.

SMARTER
Evaluated and reviewed
Evaluate consistently and recognize mastery
Exciting and Recorded 
Exciting and Reach – A goal should excite and motivate an athlete, and make them "reach" by stretching their abilities and pushing them past their comfort zone.
Ethical & Resourced, as mentioned in "Project Management Lite"
SMARTTA
Trackable and agreed
SMARRT
Realistic and relevance – 'Realistic' refers to something that can be done given the available resources. 'Relevance' ensures the goal is in line with the bigger picture and vision.
I-SMART
A social goal or objective which demonstrates "Impact"

Alternative acronyms
Other mnemonic acronyms (or contractions) also give criteria to guide in the setting of objectives.

CLEAR: Collaborative; Limited; Emotional; Appreciable; Refinable
PURE: Positively stated; Understood; Relevant; Ethical
CPQQRT:  Context; Purpose; Quantity; Quality; Resources; Timing
ABC: Achievable; Believable; Committed

See also
 Management by objectives
PDCA
 Performance indicator
 Strategic planning

References

Project management
Acronyms
Mnemonics
Goal